"The Song of the Stormy Petrel" is a short piece of revolutionary literature written by the Russian writer Maxim Gorky in 1901. The poem is written in a variation of unrhymed trochaic tetrameter with occasional Pyrrhic substitutions.

History

In 1901, no one could criticise the Tsar directly and hope to escape unhappy fate. "Aesopian language" of a fable, which had been developed into a form of art by earlier writers such as Mikhail Saltykov-Shchedrin,
was not infrequently used by the critics of the regime.

Maxim Gorky wrote "The Song of the Storm Petrel" in March 1901 in Nizhny Novgorod. It is believed that originally the text was part of a larger piece, called "Spring Melodies" (Весенние мелодии) and subtitled "Fantasy" (Фантазия).
In this "fantasy", the author overhears a conversation of birds outside his window on a late-winter day: a crow, a raven, and a bullfinch  representing the monarchist establishment; sparrows, "lesser people"; and anti-establishment siskins (чижики).
As the birds discussing the approach of the spring, it is one of the siskins who sings to his comrades "the Song of the Stormy Petrel, which he had overheard somewhere", which appears as the "fantasy's" finale.  In the "Song", the action takes place on an ocean coast, far from the streets of a central Russian town; the language calling for revolution is coded—the proud stormy petrel, unafraid of the storm (that is, revolution), as all other birds cower.

The publication of this parody of the Russian society was disallowed by the censors; however, apparently because of a censor's mistake, the siskin's "Song" was allowed to be published as a separate piece. The entire "fantasy" was published in Berlin in 1902.

The "Song" was first published in the Zhizn magazine in April 1901. Gorky was arrested for publishing "The Song", but released shortly thereafter.

The poem was later referred to as "the battle anthem of the revolution", and the epithet Burevestnik Revolyutsii (The Storm Petrel of the Revolution) soon became attached to Gorky himself. According to Nadezhda Krupskaya, "The Song" became one of Lenin's favorite works by Gorky.

The bird species in the song 

As a poet, Gorky would not pay too much attention to precisely identifying the birds species appearing in his "Song". The Russian word burevestnik (modified by appropriate adjectives) is applied to a number of species in the order Procellariiformes. According to Vladimir Dal's Dal's Dictionary, Russia's favorite dictionary in Maxim Gorky's time, burevestnik could be understood as a generic word for all members of the family Procellariidae and Hydrobatidae (including the European storm petrel).
This Russian word is not, however, used to specifically name any species properly known in English as storm-petrel. However, since the Russian burevestnik can be literally parsed by the speaker as 'the announcer of the storm', it was only appropriate for most translators into English to translate the title of the poem as "Stormy Petrel" (or, more rarely, "Storm Petrel").

Other avian characters of the poem are generic seagulls, loons (also known as "divers"; Russian, гагара), and a penguin. While North Hemisphere loons and south hemisphere penguins are not likely to meet in the wild, their joint participation in the poem is a legitimate example of a poetic license.  Or the penguin might refer to the extinct great auk, genus Pinguinus, once known commonly as "penguins".

Translations 
The Song was translated into many languages (and to almost all officially recognized languages of Russia), including German, Japanese, and Hebrew.

The text of the poem
The text in original Russian and English translation follows (the English translation is GFDL; note on translation on the discussion page).

Commemoration
The popularity of the poem in Russia's revolutionary circles, and the later "canonization" of Gorky as a preeminent classic of the "proletarian literature" ensured the wide spreading of the image of the Burevestnik ("stormy petrel") in the Soviet propaganda imagery.  A variety of institutions, products, and publications would bear the name "Burevestnik",

including a national sports club, a series of hydrofoil boats, an air base in the Kuril Islands, a labor-union resort on the Gorky Reservoir, a Moscow-Nizhny Novgorod express train, and even a brand of candy.
(See Burevestnik for a very partial list of entities so named).
Naturally, Burevestnik-themed names were especially popular in Gorky Oblast.

Maxim Gorky himself would be referred to with the epithet "the Stormy Petrel of the Revolution" (Буревестник Революции);
monuments, posters, postage stamps and commemorative coins depicting the writer would often be decorated with the image of a soaring aquatic bird.

References

External links
English translation, 1955

1901 poems
Russian poems
Works by Maxim Gorky